Sotero Julao Baluyut (born Sotero Baluyut y Julao; January 3, 1889 – January 6, 1975), also known as Sotero Baluyot, was a Filipino politician and engineer.

Biography

Sotero Julao Baluyut was born on January 3, 1889, in San Fernando, Pampanga. His parents were Leoncio Baluyut and Casimira Julao. In 1904, Baluyut was given the opportunity to study at the expense of the government in the United States. After he studied in Santa Ana Central and High School in California and the University Summer School of Illinois, he obtained a bachelor's degree in Civil Engineering from the University of Iowa. In 1911, Baluyut returned to the Philippines, where he went to work for the Office of Public Works as an assistant engineer in the provinces of Pampanga and Cavite. Afterwards, from 1912 to 1919, he was district engineer for the provinces of Isabela, Antique, Ilocos Norte, Bulacan and Pangasinan. He also worked on the San Jose-Santa Fe Road. In 1920, he became an engineer for the Pampanga Sugar Development Corporation.

In 1925, Baluyut was elected governor of the province of Pampanga. He was re-elected three years later. During his term of six years as governor, he was responsible for the construction of many schools, hospitals, roads and bridges. One of the larger projects that was realized in his term was a long paved road straight through the province. After his second term, Baluyut was elected in 1931 and re-elected in 1934 as a member of Senate from 3rd Senatorial District. In the Senate, among other things, he enacted the law which led to the establishment of   National Electric Power and Development Corporation. At the end of 1937, Baluyut was elected governor of the province of Pampanga for a third term. He was appointed as Secretary of Labor from 1938 to 1940 while serving as governor. He became Secretary of Public Works and Communications from 1951 to 1952.

Baluyut died in Manila on January 6, 1975, at the age of 86.
He was married to Encarnacion Lopez and had a son with her.

References

External links
Senator Sotero Baluyot
SUPREME COURT, Manila

1889 births
1975 deaths
Quezon administration cabinet members
Quirino administration cabinet members
Secretaries of Labor and Employment of the Philippines
20th-century Filipino politicians
20th-century Filipino engineers
Filipino Roman Catholics
Filipino expatriates in the United States
Senators of the 9th Philippine Legislature
Senators of the 10th Philippine Legislature
Secretaries of Public Works and Highways of the Philippines
Secretaries of the Interior and Local Government of the Philippines
People from San Fernando, Pampanga
Governors of Pampanga
University of Iowa alumni
Nacionalista Party politicians